Mountville is an unincorporated community and census-designated place (CDP) in Laurens County, South Carolina, United States. The population was 108 at the 2010 census, down from 130 at the 2000 census. It is part of the Greenville–Mauldin–Easley Metropolitan Statistical Area.

Geography
Mountville is located in southern Laurens County at  (34.362544, -81.970573). South Carolina Highway 72 runs along the eastern side of the community, leading northeast  to Clinton and southwest  to Greenwood. South Carolina Highway 39 forms the western edge of the Mountville CDP; it leads north  to Laurens, the county seat, and south  to Highway 72 at Cross Hill.

The CDP drains east to Beaverdam Creek, a tributary of the Little River, part of the Saluda River watershed, and south to North Campbell Creek, a tributary of Mudlick Creek, which also flows to the Little River and thence the Saluda.

Demographics

As of the census of 2000, there were 130 people, 51 households, and 41 families residing in the CDP. The population density was 45.9 people per square mile (17.7/km2). There were 59 housing units at an average density of 20.8/sq mi (8.0/km2). The racial makeup of the CDP was 83.85% White, 15.38% African American, and 0.77% from two or more races.

There were 51 households, out of which 27.5% had children under the age of 18 living with them, 58.8% were married couples living together, 15.7% had a female householder with no husband present, and 19.6% were non-families. 13.7% of all households were made up of individuals, and 9.8% had someone living alone who was 65 years of age or older. The average household size was 2.55 and the average family size was 2.78.

In the CDP, the population was spread out, with 21.5% under the age of 18, 5.4% from 18 to 24, 23.8% from 25 to 44, 28.5% from 45 to 64, and 20.8% who were 65 years of age or older. The median age was 42 years. For every 100 females, there were 85.7 males. For every 100 females age 18 and over, there were 88.9 males.

The median income for a household in the CDP was $42,885, and the median income for a family was $32,083. Males had a median income of $38,750 versus $31,250 for females. The per capita income for the CDP was $20,498. There were 17.4% of families and 18.0% of the population living below the poverty line, including 46.2% of under eighteens and none of those over 64.

References

External links
 ACCESS 15; Laurens County Public, educational, and government access (PEG) cable TV channel

Census-designated places in Laurens County, South Carolina
Census-designated places in South Carolina
Upstate South Carolina